Luther Raymond Harvel (September 30, 1905 – April 10, 1986), nicknamed "Red", was an American professional baseball player, scout and manager. Born in Cambria, Illinois, he spent almost 50 years in baseball, his career stretching from 1926 into the 1970s. He appeared in 40 games in Major League Baseball for the  Cleveland Indians, getting into 40 games from July 31st on, including 39 in center.

Luther spent most of 1928 at Omaha, hitting .352. He played 13 years in the minors and also managed five seasons. During his 1928 MLB stint — all but one game of which occurred in August and September of that season — Harvel collected 30 hits in 136 at bats, with six doubles and one triple.

Harvel was later a scout for the Kansas City/Oakland A's (1967-1968), Cleveland Indians (1969-1970), Los Angeles Dodgers (1971-1972), and A's again (1973-1974).

He died on 10 April 1986, in Kansas City, Jackson, Missouri, United States, at the age of 80.

References

External links

1905 births
1986 deaths
Augusta Wolves players
Baseball players from Illinois
Cleveland Indians players
Cleveland Indians scouts
Dallas Steers players
Dubuque Speasmen players
Jersey City Skeeters players
Kansas City Athletics scouts
Kansas City Blues (baseball) players
Leavenworth Braves players
Los Angeles Dodgers scouts
Major League Baseball outfielders
Monroe White Sox players
Oakland Athletics scouts
Oklahoma City Indians players
Omaha Buffaloes players
Omaha Crickets players
San Antonio Indians players
Shreveport Sports players
Topeka Senators players
Wichita Aviators players
People from Williamson County, Illinois